John Noel Hillier (born 1944) is a former athlete who competed for England.

Athletics career
He represented England and won a bronze medal in the discus event, at the 1974 British Commonwealth Games in Christchurch, New Zealand. Four years later he represented England in the discus event, at the 1978 Commonwealth Games in Edmonton, Alberta, Canada.

References

1944 births
English male discus throwers
Commonwealth Games medallists in athletics
Commonwealth Games bronze medallists for England
Athletes (track and field) at the 1974 British Commonwealth Games
Living people
Medallists at the 1974 British Commonwealth Games